The 28th century BC was a century that lasted from the year 2800 BC to 2701 BC.

Events
c. 2800 BC – 2700 BC: Seated Harp Player, from Keros, Cyclades, is made. It is now at the Metropolitan Museum of Art, New York.
2775 BC – 2650 BC: Second Dynasty wars in Ancient Egypt.
 c. 2750 BC: Estimated ending of the Cucuteni-Trypillian culture in the region of modern-day Romania, Moldova, and southwestern Ukraine.[7][7]
2650 BC: End of the Early Dynastic I Period, and the beginning of the Early Dynastic II Period in Mesopotamia.

Inventions, discoveries, introductions
 The city of Tyre is founded in 2750 BC (according to Herodotus).

References

 

 
-2
-72